The 2020 Ms. Olympia was a IFBB professional bodybuilding competition and part of Joe Weider's Olympia Fitness & Performance Weekend 2020 and was held on December 18, 2020 at the Orange County Convention Center in Orlando, Florida. It was the 36th Ms. Olympia competition held. Other events at the exhibition include the 212 Olympia, Bikini Olympia, Classic Physique Olympia, Figure Olympia, Fitness Olympia, Men's Physique Olympia, Mr. Olympia, Wheelchair Olympia, and Women's Physique Olympia competitions.

Prize money
 1st - $50,000
 2nd - $20,000
 3rd - $12,000
 4th - $7,000
 5th - $6,000
 Total: $95,000

Results
 1st - Andrea Shaw
 2nd - Margie Martin
 3rd - Helle Trevino
 4th - MayLa Ash
 5th - Irene Andersen
 6th - Monique Jones
 7th - Asha Hadley
 8th - Nicki Chartrand
 9th - Reshanna Boswell
 10th - Margita Zamolova
 11th - Kim Buck
 12th - LaDawn McDay
 13th - Yaxeni Oriquen-Garcia
 14th - Theresa Ivancik
 15th - Janeen Lankowski

Comparison to previous Olympia results:
 +8 - Margie Martin
 +9 - Helle Trevino
 +2 - Monique Jones
 Same - Kim Buck
 -8 - Yaxeni Oriquen-Garcia

Scorecard

Notable events
 The day of the 2020 Ms. Olympia, 18 December, is also the 37th birthday of Andrea Shaw.
 The 2020 Olympia Press Conference was the first conference to feature Ms. Olympia competitors since 2007.
 On the early morning day of the 2020 Ms. Olympia, it was revealed after the 2020 Ms. Olympia prejudging when Iris Kyle did not show up that it was confirmed she would not be competing at the 2020 Ms.
 At the 2020 Ms. Olympia finals, Yaxeni Oriquen-Garcia announced she would retire from bodybuilding.
 This is Andrea Shaw's 1st Ms. Olympia title.

2020 Ms. Olympia Qualified

Points standings

 In the event of a tie, the competitor with the best top five contest placings will be awarded the qualification. If both competitors have the same contest placings, than both will qualify for the Olympia.

See also
 2020 Mr. Olympia

References

External links
Ms. Olympia homepage
Ms. Olympia pay per view

2020 in bodybuilding
Ms. Olympia
Ms. Olympia
History of female bodybuilding